William Bertram may refer to:

William Bertram (MP), in 1431, MP for Northumberland Warden and Governor of Channel Islands 1447
William Bertram (actor) (1880–1933), Canadian-born actor and film director
William Bertram (cricketer) (1883–1959), South African cricketer
William Bertram (politician) (1875–1957), Australian politician
Billy Bertram (1897–1962), English footballer

See also

William Bartram (1739–1823), American naturalist
Bertram (surname)